Birdsview is an unincorporated community in Skagit County, in the U.S. state of Washington.

History
A post office called Birdsview was established in 1881, and remained in operation until 1934. The community was named for Birdsey "Bird" Minkler, an early postmaster.

References

 

Unincorporated communities in Skagit County, Washington
Unincorporated communities in Washington (state)